Gregory Zeschuk  is a Canadian businessman who was a VP at Electronic Arts and General Manager at BioWare Austin until 2012. He co-founded video game developer BioWare in Edmonton in 1995 with Ray Muzyka and Augustine Yip, after all three earned their medical degrees from the University of Alberta. Zeschuk announced his retirement from BioWare on September 18, 2012. He is currently involved in a number of projects related to the craft-beer industry, including the production of a web-based interview show known as "The Beer Diaries." Greg is also the chairman of the board of the smart playground technology startup, Biba Ventures based in Vancouver, BC.

BioWare projects credited with platforms and dates

 Shattered Steel (PC and Mac, 1996)
 Baldur's Gate (PC and Mac, 1998)
 Baldur's Gate: Tales of the Sword Coast (PC and Mac, 1999)
 MDK2 (Dreamcast and PC, 2000)
 Baldur's Gate II: Shadows of Amn (PC and Mac, 2000)
 Baldur's Gate II: Throne of Bhaal (PC and Mac, 2001)
 MDK2: Armageddon (PS2, 2001)
 Neverwinter Nights (PC and Mac, 2002)
 Neverwinter Nights: Shadows of Undrentide (PC and Mac, 2003)
 Neverwinter Nights: Hordes of the Underdark (PC and Mac, 2003)
 Neverwinter Nights: Kingmaker (PC and Mac, 2005)
 Star Wars: Knights of the Old Republic ("KotOR") (Xbox and PC and Mac, 2003)
 Jade Empire (Xbox, 2005/PC, 2006)
 Mass Effect (Xbox 360, 2007/PC, 2008/PlayStation 3, 2012)
 Sonic Chronicles: The Dark Brotherhood (2008)
 Dragon Age: Origins (PC, Xbox 360, PlayStation 3 and Mac, 2009)
 Mass Effect 2 (Xbox 360, PC, January 26, 2010) (PlayStation 3, January 18, 2011)
 Dragon Age II (PC, Xbox 360, PlayStation 3, March 8, 2011)
 Star Wars: The Old Republic (PC, December 20, 2011)
 Mass Effect 3 (PC, Xbox 360, PlayStation 3, March 6, 2012)

Awards and recognition
At the Game Developers Choice Awards, on March 27, 2013, Zeschuk received the Lifetime Achievement Award.

On December 27, 2018, Zeschuk was appointed to the Order of Canada.

References

External links
 Bioware website
 The Beer Diaries website 

 Biba Ventures

Canadian video game designers
Canadian people of Ukrainian descent
People from Edmonton
Living people
Members of the Order of Canada
University of Alberta alumni
BioWare people
Year of birth missing (living people)
Academy of Interactive Arts & Sciences Hall of Fame inductees
Game Developers Conference Lifetime Achievement Award recipients